Badhni Kalan is a town and a nagar nigham in Moga district  in the state of Punjab, India.  Kalan is Persian language word which means Big.

Demographics
 India census, Badhni Kalan had a population of 6373. Males constitute 52% of the population and females 48%. Badhni Kalan has an average literacy rate of 58%, lower than the national average of 59.5%; with 53% of the males and 47% of females literate. 11% of the population is under 6 years of age.

Badhni Kalan is Nanka Pind of Baba Nand Singh Jee Nanaksar Wale.
Badhni kalan is located on moga to Barnala road.

External links 
 A great site dedicated to Badhni Kalan

References

Cities and towns in Moga district